David Hill (Karonghyontye) ("Flying Sky") (12 Jan 1745–Nov 1790), was a Mohawk chief during the American Revolution. As a prominent war chief he is often titled "Captain" David Hill.

Personal
He was born in the Lower Mohawk Village of Tiononderoge, the son of Aaron Hill (Oseraghete) and Margaret Green (Tekonwanonronnih). He was the brother of Aaron Hill (Kanonraron), who also became a prominent war chief in the Revolution. He married Esther Spring (or Springstead) (Dekahondagweh) around 1770. The couple had six children.
Hill was a member of the Bear Clan, and held the title Astawenserontha ("Wearing Rattles").

Revolutionary War
Like the other Mohawks Hill was a Loyalist, a close associate of William Johnson and a friend of Joseph Brant. Among other things, David and his brother Aaron accompanied British Captain John Munro on his raid of Ballston, New York in 1780.

See also
 Colonel Guy Johnson and Karonghyontye (Captain David Hill)

References

1745 births
1790 deaths
People from New York (state)
Native Americans in the American Revolution